His First Crush is an EP recorded by Hardcore band The Bled. It was released after only two months of the band being together, on a friend's record company, Rocket Records. Only 1,000 copies were pressed, which sold quickly as interest in the band grew.

Track listing
All songs written by The Bled

 "His First Crush" – 3:08
 "Anvil Piñata" – 3:38
 "Swatting Flies with a Wrecking Ball" – 2:22
 "Glitterbomb" – 3:58
 "F Is for Forensics" – 4:27

Reissue
All of the songs from this album were re-released on Pass the Flask (Reissue).

Credits
Adam Goss - vocals
Mike Celi - bass
Ross Ott - guitar
Jeremy Ray Talley - guitar, vocals
Mike Pedicone - drums
Rosshole666 - Cover photo, layout

References

The Bled albums
2001 debut EPs